Stygiotrechus is a genus of beetles in the family Carabidae, containing the following species:

 Stygiotrechus azami Ashida & Kitayama, 2004
 Stygiotrechus eos Ueno & Naito, 2003
 Stygiotrechus esakii Ueno, 1969
 Stygiotrechus itoi Ashida & Kitayama, 2003
 Stygiotrechus iyonis Ueno & Ashida, 2003
 Stygiotrechus kadanus Ueno, 2001
 Stygiotrechus kitayamai Ueno, 2001
 Stygiotrechus kubotai Ueno, 1958
 Stygiotrechus misatonis Ashida & Kitayama, 2003
 Stygiotrechus miyoshiorum Ueno, 1969
 Stygiotrechus morimotoi Ueno, 1973
 Stygiotrechus nishikawai Ueno, 1980
 Stygiotrechus ohtanii Ueno, 1969
 Stygiotrechus pachys Ueno, 1970
 Stygiotrechus parvulus Ueno, 1969
 Stygiotrechus sasajii Ueno & Naito, 2007
 Stygiotrechus satoui Ueno, 1976
 Stygiotrechus unidentatus Ueno, 1969

References

Trechinae